Talvela is a surname. Notable people with the surname include:

Martti Talvela (1935–1989), Finnish operatic bass
Paavo Talvela (1897–1973), Finnish soldier

Finnish-language surnames